Diego Emmanuel García (born 8 February 1983) is an Argentine actor, whose most well-known roles were that of Marcos Aguilar in Cris Morena's television series Rebelde Way and Martín Barracuda in Chiquititas, where he starred alongside Camila Bordonaba for two seasons (1997—1999) to form one of the Chiquititas' fan-favorite couples. 

Nowadays, he works as riding master.

Filmography

Discography

Soundtrack albums 
 1997 — Chiquititas Vol. 3
 1998 — Chiquititas Vol. 4
 1999 — Chiquititas Vol. 5
 2004 — Floricienta
 2007 — Romeo y Julieta

External links 
 Diego García at the Internet Movie Database 

1983 births
Argentine male film actors
21st-century Argentine male singers
Argentine male stage actors
Argentine male television actors
Male actors from Buenos Aires
Living people